#MeToo, Now What? was a PBS television show hosted by Zainab Salbi. It had five 30-minute episodes and was first aired on February 2, 2018.

Production 
The show followed the theme of the MeToo movement and the Harvey Weinstein sexual abuse cases. It was hosted by Zainab Salbi, the founder of Women for Women International.

In the five episodes, Salbi interviewed political commentator Angela Rye, writer Ijeoma Oluo, activist Nadine Strossen, and a former Alamo Drafthouse Cinema's blog editor who was accused of sexual assault as his accuser.

See also 

 Between Two Worlds: Escape From Tyranny: Growing Up in the Shadow Of Saddam (book by the host)

References

External links 

 #MeToo, Now What? official website on PBS

2000s American documentary television series
2000s American television miniseries
2008 American television series debuts
2008 American television series endings
PBS original programming
Works about sexual abuse
Television shows about sex crimes
MeToo movement